Lewis Edward Burras (born 12 February 2000) is a British competitive swimmer. He is the British record holder in the long course 100 metre freestyle. He is a 2022 Commonwealth Games silver medalist in the 50 metre freestyle, 4×100 metre freestyle relay, and 4×100 metre mixed freestyle relay, swimming on the finals relay for both relay events. At the 2022 World Aquatics Championships, he won a bronze medal in the 4×100 metre medley relay, swimming freestyle on the prelims relay, placed seventh in the 50 metre freestyle and seventh in the 100 metre freestyle. He placed eighth in the final of the 50 metre freestyle and twelfth in the semifinals of the 100 metre freestyle at the 2022 World Short Course Championships.

Background
Burras was born 12 February 2000. He attended Jumeirah English Speaking School in Dubai, United Arab Emirates for high school, where he competed scholastically as part of the school swim team, and attended the University of South Carolina in the United States for university, where he competed collegiately as part of the South Carolina Gamecocks swim team. In international competition, he competes representing Great Britain and England.

Career

2017 World Junior Championships
For the 2017 FINA World Junior Swimming Championships, held in August in Indianapolis, United States, Burras placed 24th in the 100 metre freestyle with a time of 51.03 seconds, and ranked seventh in the preliminaries of the 50 metre freestyle with a 22.70 before being disqualified in the semifinals.

2018 European Junior Championships

At the 2018 European Junior Swimming Championships, held in Helsinki, Finland in July, Burras won two medals. In the 50 metre freestyle, he won the bronze medal with a time of 22.69 seconds, finishing within one-tenth of a second of silver medalist Kliment Kolesnikov of Russia. He won his second medal in the 4×100 metre mixed medley relay, splitting a 49.13 for the freestyle leg of the relay in the preliminaries to help qualify the relay to the final ranking first, where the finals relay placed second in a time of 3:51.43 and Burras won a silver medal for his contributions in the preliminaries.

2022

2022 British Swimming Championships
In April 2022, at the year's British Swimming Championships, held at Ponds Forge in Sheffield, Burras won the gold medal in the 100 metre freestyle with a personal best time of 47.88 seconds. A few days later, he won the gold medal in the 50 metre freestyle with a personal best time of 21.77 seconds. Based on his results at the Championships, he was named to the 2022 World Aquatics Championships team representing Great Britain and the 2022 Commonwealth Games team representing England.

2022 World Aquatics Championships

Burras started off on the first day of pool swimming competition, day two overall, at the 2022 World Aquatics Championships, held at Danube Arena in June in Budapest, Hungary, with a fourth-place finish in the 4×100 metre freestyle relay, helping achieve a new British record and English record time of 3:11:14 with a lead-off time of 48.09 seconds. Three days later, in the semifinals of the 100 metre freestyle, he swam a personal best time of 47.63 seconds to set new British and English records in the event and qualify for the final ranking fourth. The following day, he placed seventh in the final with a time of 48.23 seconds. In the 50 metre freestyle final two days later, he achieved a time of 21.81 seconds to place seventh and finish 0.24 seconds behind bronze medalist Maxime Grousset of France. For the final day of pool swimming, the next day, he helped achieve a fourth-place finish in the 4×100 metre mixed freestyle relay in a time of 3:22.44, swimming the second 100 metres portion of the relay in 47.86 seconds. He also split a 47.90 for the freestyle leg of the 4×100 metre medley relay in the preliminaries, helping qualify the relay to the final ranking fifth. On the finals relay in the evening, he was substituted out, Tom Dean was substituted in, and all preliminaries and finals relay members won a bronze medal when the finals relay finished third in 3:31.31.

2022 Commonwealth Games

In his first event of swimming at the 2022 Commonwealth Games, the 4×100 metre mixed freestyle relay on day one of competition, conducted at Sandwell Aquatics Centre in Birmingham, Burras led-off the finals relay with a time of 48.28 seconds to help win the silver medal in 3:22.45. Leading off the 4×100 metre freestyle relay in the final of the event the following day, he swam a 48.39 to help achieve a time of 3:11.73 and win the silver medal. In the preliminaries of the 100 metre freestyle the following day, he was one of three swimmers representing England to qualify for the semifinals, ranking twelfth overall with his time of 49.70 seconds. He placed thirteenth in the semifinals with a time of 49.96 seconds.

For the preliminaries of the 50 metre freestyle on day five, Burras ranked as the fastest swimmer across all heats with a time of 22.09 seconds, which was 0.45 seconds faster than fellow semifinals qualifier and Englishman Ben Proud, who ranked third overall. Lowering his time to a 21.92 in the semifinals, he qualified for the final ranking second. In the final, he finished in a person best time of 21.68 seconds to win the silver medal behind Ben Proud.

2022 World Short Course Championships
In October, Burras was named to the British Swimming roster for the 2022 World Short Course Championships, held in December following the transplanting of the meet from the Palace of Water Sports in Kazan, Russia, to the Melbourne Sports and Aquatic Centre in Melbourne, Australia. For the 50 metre butterfly on day one, 13 December, he placed thirty-fifth overall with a personal best time of 23.18 seconds. The second morning, he swam a personal best time of 46.92 seconds in the preliminaries of the 100 metre freestyle, dropping 3.99 seconds from his previous best mark of 50.91 seconds to qualify for the semifinals ranking thirteenth. He placed twelfth in the semifinals with a personal best time of 46.61 seconds. Day four, he achieved a 2.52 second drop from his personal best time of 23.52 seconds from 2016 in the preliminaries of the 50 metre freestyle, qualifying for the semifinals ranking sixth with his new personal best time of 21.00 seconds. He further lowered his personal best time in the semifinals, achieving a time of 20.94 seconds to qualify for the final tied in rank for fifth with Dylan Carter of Trinidad and Tobago. In the final of the 50 metre freestyle the following day he placed eighth, finishing 0.03 seconds behind seventh-place finisher Kyle Chalmers of Australia and 0.49 seconds behind gold medalist Jordan Crooks of the Cayman Islands with a time of 20.95 seconds.

International championships (50 m)

 Burras swam only in the prelims heats.

International championships (25 m)

Personal best times

Long course metres (50 m pool)

Legend: sf – semifinal

Short course metres (25 m pool)

Legend: h – preliminary heat; sf – semifinal

National records

Long course metres (50 m pool)

Legend: sf – semifinal

References

External links
 

2000 births
Living people
British male swimmers
English male freestyle swimmers
South Carolina Gamecocks men's swimmers
Swimmers at the 2022 Commonwealth Games
21st-century British people
Commonwealth Games silver medallists for England
Commonwealth Games medallists in swimming
Medallists at the 2022 Commonwealth Games